
Suzanne Aubry  (born 1956) is a Canadian novelist, screenwriter and playwright from Montreal. 

Suzanne Aubry was born in Ottawa. Both parents, Claude Aubry and Paule Saint-Onge, were novelists. She graduated in playwriting from the National Theatre School of Canada and in 1987, her play La nuit des p'tits couteaux was nominated for a Governor General's Award. Suzanne Aubry wrote the screenplay for the 1994 feature film Meurtre en musique, directed by Gabriel Pelletier. With Louise Pelletier, she wrote the screenplays for three prime time television series: Sauve qui peut! ( TVA), À nous deux! and Mon meilleur ennemi  (Radio-Canada). Prior to this, she contributed episodes of Manon   which was aired on Radio-Canada, and La Maison Deschênes, the first soap opera for Télévision Quatre Saisons (TQS).

As a critic and columnist, Suzanne Aubry has contributed to Le Devoir and the Cahiers de théâtre Jeu. She has taught playwriting at the Institut national de l'image et du son, the Université du Québec à Montréal and the National Theatre School of Canada. She was the President of the Société des auteurs en cinéma et télévision (SARTEC) from 1996 to 2000.

In 2006, Suzanne Aubry published her first novel Le fort intérieur, which was nominated for the Grand prix de la relève littéraire Archambault. Since then, she has written seven books in the series Fanette, revolving around an Irish orphan exiled to 19th century Quebec. The series has sold more than 100,000 copies  and the first two volumes of Fanette are available in English in digital format.

The author's 9th novel, Ma vie est entre tes mains, was published in 2015 by Libre Expression. The French publisher Robert Laffont purchased the rights to the book, which was published in France under the title Ma vie entre tes mains in 2016. It was then nominated for the Prix des cinq continents de la francophonie 2016, presided over by the writer J. M. G. Le Clézio. Ma vie entre tes mains was also published by Pocket in a paperback format in 2018. Aubry has since written two other novels, Je est une autre and La Cueva (Éditions Libre Expression), both  well received by the readers and the media.

Following in her father's footsteps, Suzanne Aubry recently adapted his book Le Violon magique et autres légendes du Canada français (originally published in 1968 by les Éditions Des deux Rives). This new edition is entitled Le Violon magique - Contes et légendes du Québec and published by les Éditions Québec Amérique. It features illustrations by the artist Saul Field, which were a part of the 1968 edition.

Suzanne Aubry has completed a play for the theatre, Recyclage, which has been refined in a workshop organized by the Centre des auteurs dramatiques (CEAD) with the collaboration of the director, Marie Charlebois, and the actress, Évelyne Rompré. The author has also written her first children's novel, Le Septième étage et demi, about Camille, a 13 years' old teenager who loses her mother from cancer, and tries to cope with her loss. The book, superbly illustrated by Delphie Côté-Lacroix, was published by les Éditions Québec Amérique in 2022. Since, the book was nominated for the prestigious Tamarac/Tree of books Award, organized by the Association des bibliothèques de l'Ontario (ABO).  

In 2021, Suzanne Aubry revisited her popular historical series Fanette. The first book, Fanette - La suite - Amitiés particulières, was published by Les Éditions Libre Expression in 2021. The second and third books, Fanette, - La suite - Aveux and Fanette- La suite - Un monde nouveau- were published in 2022 by Libre Expression.  

Suzanne Aubry has been a member of the board of directors of the Union des Écrivaines et des Écrivains québécois (UNEQ) since 2011 and the Chair of UNEQ since May 2017. She was also the President of the la Société des scénaristes en télévision, radio et cinéma (SARTEC) from 1996 to 2000. She received the Order of Canada in 2022 for her contribution to Quebec literature, and her engagement defending the rights of writers.

Selected works

Plays 
 Une goutte d'eau sur la glace (1979)
 J'te l'parle mieux quand j'te l'écris (1981)
 Mon homme (1982)
 La Nuit des p'tits couteaux (Éditions Leméac, 1985)

Novels 
 Le fort intérieur, Éditions Libre Expression (2006)
 Fanette : À la conquête de la haute ville (2009), La vengeance du Lumber Lord (2009), Le secret d'Amanda (2010), L'encre et le sang (2011), Les ombres du passé (2012), Du côté des dames (2013), Honneur et disgrâce (2014), Éditions Libre Expression.
 Ma vie est entre tes mains, Éditions Libre Expression (2015)
Ma vie entre tes mains, Éditions Robert Laffont (2016) 
Ma vie entre tes mains, Éditions Pocket (2018)
Je est une autre, Éditions Libre Expression (2017)
La Cueva, Éditions Libre Expression (2019)
Le Violon magique - Contes et légendes du Québec, Éditions Québec Amérique (2019).

References

External links 
 
 Suzanne Aubry

External links 
 
 Union des Écrivaines et des Écrivains du Québec
 Éditions Libre Expression
Éditions Québec Amérique

1956 births
Living people
Canadian novelists in French
Canadian dramatists and playwrights in French
Canadian women novelists
Canadian women dramatists and playwrights
20th-century Canadian dramatists and playwrights
21st-century Canadian novelists
Writers from Quebec
National Theatre School of Canada alumni
Canadian columnists
Canadian women screenwriters
Canadian television writers
Writers from Ottawa
Franco-Ontarian people
20th-century Canadian women writers
21st-century Canadian women writers
Canadian women non-fiction writers
Canadian women television writers
Members of the Order of Canada
Writers from Montreal
Canadian women columnists